Institute for Information, Telecommunication and Media Law or ITM is a research & educational organisation located in Münster, North Rhine-Westphalia in Germany. All major research projects conducted by ITM are ordered by European Commission. Scientific Council of the Institute is presented by Prof. Dr.Dr. Gunnar Bender, Wilhelm Berneke, Jon Bing, Santiago Cavanillas, Herbert Fiedler, Heinz Lothar Grob, Fritjof Haft, Bernt Hugenholtz, Hans Jarass, Wolfgang Kilian, Miriam Meckel, Ernst-Joachim Mestmäcker, Ursula Nelles and other prominent scientists.

Research objective 

The Institute for Information, Telecommunication and Media Law (ITM) aims to explore the legal framework conditions of the information society. To learn from the experiences of other countries, comparative law is to be granted a special position. Furthermore the tasks of the institute members content the representation of information, telecommunication and media law in academic teaching and further training. The institute members busy themselves barycentricly with the application possibilities of interactive media in academic teaching and further topics of legal information.

The law of information, telecommunication and media is a cross-section matter which cannot even approximately be covered by any of the traditional legal disciplines – civil, criminal and public law. The ITM therefore strives for interdisciplinary research and teaching activities. For that reason the board of directors of the Institute is supposed to content each a professor for civil law, criminal law and public law. This institute structure is so far without archetype in the Federal Republic of Germany.

Area of researches

Information law 
Information law deals with legal problems arising from electronic data processing (EDP). Whereas formerly goods and services were in the main focus, today intangible assets like know-how, data collections, experience and ideas gain more and more economic importance. "Information Society" is a current term in order to describe our modern world where images, texts and sounds are linked in a digital way. No matter how significant information has become to our society, its legal classification is still open. Most notably in terms of civil law, we have great difficulties in determining the person certain data belong to as well as in defining the individual rights involved in that ownership. These issues serve as the basic approach concerning the department’s research activities.

Telecommunication law 
Research is especially required in the following fields: 
 The right of way in terms of para. 50 and 57 TKG (German Telecommunications Act)
 Telecommunications business and consumer protection
 Competition and anti-trust law

Media law 
Media law comprises film and music law, more precisely legal issues of creation and utilisation of films and music. Particular emphasis is put on copyright aspects and legal problems in film and music distribution.

Informatics in legal profession 
This area deals with changes in the legal professions (e.g. judges, lawyers on the private sector and those in public administration) due to the application of electronic data processing.

Scientific activities

Current research projects 
 CONSENT (Consumer sentiment regarding privacy on user generated content services in the digital economy) is a medium scale research project that is promoted by the Commission of the European Union. 19 partners from 13 European countries, including interdisciplinary institutes, research centres, universities and NGO´s, are participating in this project. CONSENT aims to examine consumer sentiment regarding privacy on user generated content (UGC) services such as YouTube, Facebook and MySpace in the digital economy. This project seeks to examine how consumer behaviour, and commercial practices are changing the role of consent in the processing of personal data and whether the recent changes to consumer and commercial practices lead to consumers (in)voluntarily signing away their fundamental right to privacy. CONSENT´s multidisciplinary team intends to carry out a status quo analysis of commercial practices, legal position and consumer attitudes, identifying criteria for fairness and best practices, and then create a toolkit for policy makers and corporate counsel which will enable them to address problems identified in the analysis. CONSENT begins in May 2010 and ends in April 2012.
 LAPSI (Legal Aspects of Public Sector Information) is a research project promoted by the European Commission and deals with the legal problems regarding Public Sector Information. 20 partners from 13 European countries are participating in this project. The main aim is to identify and discuss legal barriers to access and re-use of Public Sector Information in the digital environment and suggest ways to overcome them. Additionally, the LAPSI project intends to build a network apt to become the main European point of reference for high-level policy discussions and strategic action on all legal issues related to the access to and the re-use of Public Sector Information in the digital environment. The LAPSI project will have a duration of 30 months.
 E-Learning. The competence-centre for E-Learning is part of the European Research Centre for Information Systems (ERCIS) of the University of Münster. It is funded by the Federal Ministry for Education and Research with a focus on “New Media and Education”. The aim of this project is the development of a technology-driven model for organizing promotion and integration of E-Learning-Projects at universities. The Civil Law Department is in charge of the issue „Legal Aspects of E-Learning“. The ITM turns its attention mainly on problems regarding data protection and copyright in the field of teaching at universities.
 History of Information Law. The project is sponsored by the German Research Foundation (DFG) and constitutes a scientific attempt to reveal the origin and evolution of the field of law called information law. From the very beginning of the use of electronic data processing by the public administration and the business community many legal problems emerged and had to be solved. The question to be answered is, if information law is just a generic term describing a loose selection of topics dealing with the legal review of problems concerning information, or if there is a common theoretical foundation to constitute a legal discipline of its own. The analysis of this question concentrates on the development of privacy protection, freedom of information, legal informatics and IT-law. Besides the review of significant publications and court decisions it is also part of the project to interview the prominent jurists who worked in the field of information law in the beginning.
 Law & ICT Shared Virtual Campus. The ITM is a member of the Law&ICT Shared Virtual Campus, a project of the LEFIS networks. The project aims to offer online based courses to provide the possibility of gaining different degrees. Thereby the head of the Project is Fernando Galindo of the University of Zaragoza.
 Matters of Law in the German Research Network (DFN). The German Research Network (DFN) supports communication and the exchange of information or data between representatives of science, research, education and culture in national and international networks. In this context, the DFN also operates as an online-provider. With reference to legal questions of liability, telecommunications and data protection, the DFN-members are faced with increasing problems. As recent dispensation on liability of providers and the new German multimedia acts could not resolve the legal uncertainty in this area, practical and efficient assistance is required. Therefore the ITM functions as a legal consultant in terms of information and communication services.
 Research Centre for Industrial Property Rights. Industrial property rights play a significant role in many sectors of economy. An effective legal protection of inventions and technical advances is an unalterable condition for a working political economy. Someone who has set up in business would quickly lose the advantage of competitors, if industrial property rights did not exist. But also many law graduates are faced with an increasing demand for skills in industrial property rights, though hardly any curriculum covers this branch of law. Since its establishment in 1998, the Research Centre for Industrial Property Rights tries to supply this need by offering additional training besides its research activities on this sector.

Completed research projects 

 ECLIP (Electronic Commerce Legal Issues Platform). The ITM was coordinating partner of this major research project initiated by the Commission of the EU. In cooperation with four other research institutes in Belgium, Great Britain, Norway and Spain, questions of law with reference to electronic commerce were investigated from 1998 to 2000. The contribution of the ITM was focussed on legal aspects of copyright and taxation. Besides their extensive cross-border research activities, the ECLIP partners assisted other EU-projects by giving legal advice on technical or economic matters of electronic commerce. Furthermore ECLIP aimed at enriching the scientific debate and raising general consciousness concerning legal issues of electronic commerce. For this reason, the project partners organised specific workshops, participated in international conferences and published many works on this topic.
 Interactive Media (PISA). This project was founded by the federal state of North Rhine-Westphalia and aimed at the creation of an interactive teaching system on immovable property law (PISA stands for a practical approach to immovable property law). The students should be enabled to deepen and practice their knowledge by the use of personal computers. Within the scope of these do-it-yourself studies, time, place and speed of the learning process can be appointed by the users themselves. The concept of the programme is based on new findings in educational psychology. Another objective of the project was the development of general standards for a juristic learning software (EuLe) which could be used in academic teaching.
 MOF-project (Moderated online case study on business economics and private law). MOF-project aimed at the development of a modular system for the moderation of interactive case studies on the internet. Then the system was applied to case studies in particular disciplines and also on an interdisciplinary level.
 ZAP-Project. Project dealt with electronic presentation of juristic information. As a main target even jurists who have only limited knowledge of EDP should be enabled to find the relevant information without greater difficulties. New technologies like the internet and the possibilities of electronic commerce were in the foreground of the project.
 IPR-HD (The IPR-Helpdesk) is a European network consisting of several research institutes, law firms and consultancies. The project is promoted by the Commission of the EU and aims at supporting the use and commercialization of intellectual property rights by SMEs (small and medium-sized entities) and research institutes, particularly on a European level. The work includes, for example, assistance in finding advisory boards for registration, protection and utilization of copyrights, patents and trademarks. The IPR-HD operates with various instruments like websites, newsletters, CD-ROMs, a helpline, seminars and workshops. The project is headed by the Universidad de Alicante (Spain) and the Global Europe Consulting Group (Brussels). The ITM serves as a content provider for the German speaking area. Further partners in the field of science are the Centre de Recherches Informatiques et Droit in Namur (Belgium), the Institute of Commercial Protection of Law at the Universidad de Alicante and the Centre for Commercial Law Studies in London (Great Britain).
 RESPECT is another project initiated by the Commission of the EU. Within the scope of the Information Society Technologies (IST) programme, RESPECT is an interdisciplinary cooperation of several institutes in Great Britain, Belgium, Hungary, Austria and Germany. The project aims at drawing up a set of professional and ethical rules for socio-economic research within the EU. As the German partner, the ITM is developing guidelines for the use of intellectual property in compliance with copyright provisions of the Member States. For this, great emphasis is put on recent EU copyright directives and changes in national laws.

External links

 List of publications 
 Annual reports 
 ITM Scientific Council

References 

Information schools
Law schools in Germany
University of Münster